Petros Noeas (born 1987) is a Greek professional basketball player. At a height of 2.06 m (6'9") in height, he plays at the power forward position.

Professional career
Noeas started his career with the Greek Basket League club Maroussi, where he played from 2004 to 2009. He then moved to the Greek club Trikala 2000 (2009–10), and then back to Maroussi (2010–11). He joined the Greek club AEK Athens for the 2011–12 season, and then moved to the Greek club Koroivos. He moved to the Greek club Arkadikos, in 2014.

On 12 August 2016, Noeas joined Panionios, of the Greek 2nd Division. On 12 July 2017, Noeas joined Doukas, of the Greek 2nd Division, but his contract was later cancelled. He joined Olympiacos' new reserve team of the Greek 2nd Division, Olympiacos B, for the 2019–20 season.

National team career
Noeas was a member of the junior national teams of Greece. With Greece's junior national teams, he played at the following tournaments: the 2003 FIBA Europe Under-16 Championship, the 2004 FIBA Europe Under-18 Championship, the 2005 FIBA Europe Under-18 Championship, the 2006 FIBA Europe Under-20 Championship, and the 2007 FIBA Europe Under-20 Championship. He also won the silver medal at the 2009 Mediterranean Games, with the Greek under-26 national team.

References

External links
FIBA Profile
FIBA Europe Profile
EuroCup Profile
Eurobasket.com Profile
Draftexpress.com Profile
Hellenic Federation Profile 
AEK.com Profile

1987 births
Living people
AEK B.C. players
Arkadikos B.C. players
Centers (basketball)
Competitors at the 2009 Mediterranean Games
Diagoras Dryopideon B.C. players
Greek Basket League players
Greek men's basketball players
Koroivos B.C. players
Maroussi B.C. players
Mediterranean Games medalists in basketball
Mediterranean Games silver medalists for Greece
Olympiacos B.C. B players
Panionios B.C. players
Psychiko B.C. players
Power forwards (basketball)
Promitheas Patras B.C. players
Trikala B.C. players
Sportspeople from Kalamata